The 2021 Rio Grande Valley FC Toros season is the 6th season for Rio Grande Valley FC Toros in USL Championship (USL-C), the second-tier professional soccer league in the United States and Canada. This article covers the period from November 2, 2020, the day after the 2020 USL-C Playoff Final, to the conclusion of the 2021 USL-C Playoff Final, scheduled for November 28, 2021.

Club

 (soccer)

Competitions

Pre-season

USL Championship

Match results

Standings — Western Conference

Play-Offs

U.S. Open Cup 

2021 U.S. Open Cup was cancelled due to the COVID-19 Pandemic

Statistics 

Numbers after plus-sign(+) denote appearances as a substitute.

Appearances and goals

|-

References

2021
Rio Grande
Rio Grande Valley FC
Rio Grande